A vulva (plural: vulvas or vulvae) is the region containing external genital organs on female mammals.

Vulva may also refer to:

In zoology:
The cyphopod, or vulva, an internal genital structure in female millipedes
In nematodes, the external opening of the female reproductive system
In spiders, the spermatheca and associated ducts of the female reproductive system (also known as internal epigyne or internal genitalia)

Other:
Vulva (band), an English techno duo

See also
Volva (disambiguation)
Ulva (disambiguation)
Vagina (disambiguation)